Nicarao may refer to:
Nicarao people
Nicarao (cacique)
Nahuat language or Pipil language